Waterfall Station may refer to:

 Waterfall railway station (Ireland), a former station near Cork, Ireland
 Waterfall railway station (Isle of Man), a former station on the Isle of Man in the British Isles
 Waterfall railway station, Sydney, Australia
 Waterfall train disaster
 Waterfall Station (Singapore) of Jurong Bird Park Panorail, Singapore
 Waterfall Station (Taiwan) of Wulai Scenic Train, Taiwan